Thangjam Leikai is a small village in the Indian state of Assam. The village is also known as "Thangjamleikai" in short. It is registered as "Dakshin Mohanpur Part-II" in official revenue document. Non-Meitei people of its surrounding area call this village "Amoldar".

Gallery 

Silchar
Villages in Cachar district